Elva Dryer (née Martinez; born September 26, 1971, in Durango, Colorado) is an American long-distance runner who competed mostly in the 5000 and 10,000 meters, before turning to road running. She represented the United States at the 2000 and 2004 Summer Olympics.

Dryer went to college at Western Colorado University where she won seven NCAA DII individual national championships and one NAIA national team championship in cross country. She and fellow alumnae Nicole Aish have trained together in Colorado.

Competition record

Personal bests
Outdoor
1500 meters – 4:10.28 (Saint-Denis 2001)
One mile – 4:33.57 (Uniondale 1998)
3000 meters – 8:46.09 (Eugene 2001)
5000 meters – 15:03.56 (Oslo 2001)
10,000 meters – 31:21.92 (Palo Alto 2005)
10 kilometers – 32:28 (Mobile 2002)
15 kilometers – 48:46 (Jacksonville 2002)
20 kilometers – 1:07:18 (New Haven 2007)
Half marathon – 1:11:42 (Houston 2007)
Marathon – 2:31:48 (Chicago 2006)
Indoor
One mile – 4:36.62 (Indianapolis 1998)
3000 meters – 8:57.60 (Atlanta 2001)

References

USATF profile

1971 births
Living people
People from Durango, Colorado
Track and field athletes from Colorado
American female long-distance runners
American female marathon runners
Olympic track and field athletes of the United States
Athletes (track and field) at the 2000 Summer Olympics
Athletes (track and field) at the 2004 Summer Olympics
Western Colorado University alumni
21st-century American women